Aræotics, in pre-modern medicine, were remedies believed to open up the sweat pores of the skin. Such treatments were also believed to rarefy the humours, rendering them easy to be carried off by the pores.

To the class of aræotics belonged diaphoretics, sudorifics, etc.

References
 Chambers, Ephraim, Cyclopædia, or, An universal dictionary of arts and sciences, Vol. 1. (1728), p. 128.
Encyclopædia Britannica, 1815, ed. 5, II. 531.

Traditional medicine